Elkhart High School is a public high school located in Elkhart, Texas. It is part of the Elkhart Independent School District located in southwestern Anderson County and classified as a 3A school by the UIL. In 2013, the school was rated "Met Standard" by the Texas Education Agency.

Athletics
The Elkhart Elks compete in the following sports 

Cross Country, Volleyball, Football, Basketball, Powerlifting, Golf, Tennis, Track, Softball, Baseball , Fishing, Pole Dancing

Band
The Elkhart High School Big Red Band earned the ranking of Fourth place in the state of Texas during the 2008–09 school year.

Currently, the Elkhart High School Big Red Marching Band’s show theme is Angels and Demons mostly arranged by Randall Standridge. This big red band has qualified for finals at USBands AT&T Stadium Classic and achieved 8th place in finals. Later, the band would go on to make a 1st Division at the UIL Region 8 Marching Contest which secured their qualification for the Area Marching Contest. Then, the band would go on to make an outstanding performance during prelims and would secure their position for the final’s performance. In the end, Elkhart Big Red Band achieved 4th place overall and would have qualified for state, but unfortunately it was not a UIL State Marching Contest year for 1A, 3A, or 5A Schools in Texas. Overall, the Elkhart High School Big Red Band has had an outstanding and impressive 2022 Marching season.

Notable alumnus
 Jeff Wilson, an American football player, played for North Texas. He now plays for the Miami Dolphins.

References

External links
Elkhart Independent School District

Schools in Anderson County, Texas
Public high schools in Texas